The Pacho Formation (Kslp) is a geological formation of the Altiplano Cundiboyacense, Eastern Ranges of the Colombian Andes.

Etymology 
The formation was defined and named in 1982 by Ulloa after Pacho, Cundinamarca.

Description

Lithologies 

Stratigraphy and depositional environment 
The Pacho Formation, pertaining to the Villeta Group, partly overlies and is partly lateral equivalent with the Hiló Formation and is partly overlain by and partly time equivalent with the Simijaca Formation. The age has been estimated to be Late Albian to Cenomanian. Stratigraphically, the formation is time equivalent with the Une Formation. The formation has been deposited in an outer marine platform environment.

Outcrops 

The Pacho Formation is found around its type locality near Pacho.

Regional correlations

See also 

 Geology of the Eastern Hills
 Geology of the Ocetá Páramo
 Geology of the Altiplano Cundiboyacense

References

Bibliography

Maps

External links 
 

Geologic formations of Colombia
Cretaceous Colombia
Lower Cretaceous Series of South America
Upper Cretaceous Series of South America
Albian Stage
Cenomanian Stage
Shale formations
Open marine deposits
Formations
Geography of Cundinamarca Department
Muysccubun